Ko Samet (Cajeput Island;) is one of the eastern seaboard islands of Thailand. Ko Samet is part of the Phe Subdistrict of the Amphoe Mueang Rayong (the capital district, or Amphoe Mueang), of Rayong Province. Ko Samet is the largest and westernmost of a cluster of islands not far from the coast. Ko Samet measures  from north to south.

Popular with foreign tourists and as a weekend getaway for residents of nearby Bangkok, most of the island (excluding the Na Dan area) is in the Khao Laem Ya–Mu Ko Samet National Park.  In 1981, the Royal Forest Department declared the archipelago of Samet, along with nine other small islands, the headland of Khao Laem Ya, and the  Mae Ramphueng Beach to be a national park, and thus Ko Samet is under the protection of the National Parks Division of the Thai government.

History
The Thai government restricted overnight stay on the island until 1981 (even though Bangkokians had known of the beauty of Ko Samet for decades). In that year, on 1 October, the Forestry Department of Thailand declared Ko Samet and environs to be a national park.

Geography and climate
Along the length of the "t" (north-south) the island measures approximately 7 km, and measures 4 km across the "t" (west-east). Forests blanket up to 80 percent of the total area.

Closest to the mainland, lies the small island port village of Na Dan, commonly known as Ko Samet Village, with its nearby beach, Hat Sai Kaeo (Glass Sand Beach), the longest beach on Ko Samet. Most of Ko Samet's beaches lie along the eastern shore of the island. Other beaches on the island include: Ao Phai, Ao Wai, Ao Kio Na Nai, Ao Cho, Ao Kio Na Nok, Ao Wong Duean, Cape Kut, Ao Toei, and Ao Karang at the southern tip, and Ao Phrao on the western shore of the island. Just off the southern tip of the island are three small rock-islands, Ko Chan (Moon Island), Ko San Chalam (Shark Fin Island), and Hin Khao (White Rock).

Ko Samet is one of the driest archipelagos in Thailand. Ko Samet gets significantly less rainfall than Rayong Province, even though it is only a few kilometres offshore. The island's "rainy season" extends only from May to July, but even during this season it has less rain than other islands in Thailand. The island, despite being arid, consists of lush forested hills, covered with evergreen and deciduous forest and cajeput trees grow abundantly (the name "samet" means "cajeput"). Owing to the lack of rain, Ko Samet must import potable water from the mainland.

Administration
Ko Samet is administered by the Phe Sub-district, Mueang Rayong District, Rayong Province. Ko Samet is also under the aegis of the national park area (Khao Laem Ya–Mu Ko Samet National Park), and all foreign visitors are required to pay a 200 baht (approximately US$5.60) entry fee upon arrival.

Transport
There are two main arteries on Ko Samet: the northern route connects Hat Sai Kaeo to Ao Klang and Ao Noina. The central route consists of four smaller roads. The first road links Sai Kaeo beach to Ao Phai and Ao Phutsa. The second road connects the center of island to Ao Wong Duean. The third road connects the first road to Ao Thapthim and Ao Nuan. The fourth road connects the first road to Ao Phrao.

Songthaews are the chief means of public transport.

There are five piers: Ao Klang, Ao Phrao, Ao Wong Duean, Ao Thian, and Ao Wai. Ao Klang Pier is the port to mainland. The rest are piers for diving and excursions.

In popular culture

During the 19th century the poet Sunthorn Phu (1786–1855), set part of his epic work, Phra Aphai Mani (sometimes transliterated as Pra Apaimanee), on the shores of the island. Statues of the title character, Prince Aphai Mani and the siren/mermaid which guided him to Ko Samet can be found on Hat Sai Kaeo Beach.

Gallery

See also
List of islands of Thailand
List of national parks of Thailand

References

External links

 
 Khao Laem Ya - Mu Ko Samet National Park

Geography of Rayong province
Samet
Islands of the Gulf of Thailand